Camp Arrowhead, also known as Camp Glen Arden after 1972, is a historic summer camp and national historic district located near Tuxedo, Henderson County, North Carolina. It was established in 1919 by the Green River Manufacturing Company as a recreational facility, and became a boy's summer camp in 1937. The district encompasses 18 contributing buildings, 1 contributing site, and 5 contributing structures. Notable Rustic Revival style contributing buildings include the Recreation Hall/Gymnasium (#1919; alterations 1941; ca. 1940s); the group of log cabins dating from the original use of the camp by the Green River Manufacturing Company (1919); Ramshackle Cabin (1937); the Dining Hall/Kitchen (1941; alterations c. 1946); Mansion Cabin (c. 1946); and the Horse Barn (1953).

It was listed on the National Register of Historic Places in 2005.

References

Event venues on the National Register of Historic Places in North Carolina
Historic districts on the National Register of Historic Places in North Carolina
Buildings and structures in Henderson County, North Carolina
National Register of Historic Places in Henderson County, North Carolina